The OG-43 and its subsequent version, OG-44, are submachine guns manufactured in small numbers in the Republic of Salo.

Origins and development 
The OG-43, designed by Giovanni Oliani in the factory based in Cremona named Società Anonima Revelli Manifattura Armiguerra, was an advanced submachine gun, designed for compactness and ease of mass production. It is part of a family of weapons produced under emergency measures during the time of the Italian Social Republic, which include the TZ-45 machine gun, FNAB-43 and Isotta Fraschini. The next version, the OG-44, instead had a more traditional shape. The Ministry of War of the RSI had approved the construction, but it was never initiated as events unfolded.

Description 
The OG-43 sported a very modern design, compared to its contemporaries. The receiver was made of stamped sheet metal, with the magazine serving as a grip. The bulk of the L-shaped bolt, along with the recoil spring,  was housed in a cylinder directly above the barrel, which helped reduce muzzle climb when firing. The reciprocating cocking handle was located in the forward section of the bolt housing. The weapon was short-recoil blowback operated, and fired from an open bolt in both automatic and semi-automatic mode. Adjustable iron sights were fitted, with two possible settings for either 100m or 200m. Initially equipped with forward-folding metal stock, later production runs were fitted with simpler, wooden fixed stocks. It used the same double-stack magazines as the Beretta MAB 38, available in 10, 20, 30 or 40 rounds.

OG-44 
The OG-44 version exhibited more traditional lines. It adopts the traditional wooden stock hinged to the pistol grip, positioned behind the trigger and the magazine well. It was slightly heavier than the OG-43, as well as the total length of 787 mm.

See also 
 Fucile Armaguerra Mod. 39
 TZ-45
 FNAB-43

Sources
 Pierangelo Tendas, Armaguerra Cremona OG44

External links 
 http://world.guns.ru/smg/it/submachine-gun-armaguerra-og-43-og-44-e.html
 http://www.securityarms.com/20010315/galleryfiles/2800/2862.htm

World War II submachine guns
World War II infantry weapons of Italy
9mm Parabellum submachine guns
Submachine guns of Italy